Cardinal Mooney High School may refer to:
Cardinal Mooney Catholic High School (Michigan)
Cardinal Mooney High School (New York)
Cardinal Mooney High School (Florida)
Cardinal Mooney High School (Ohio)